Carmichael is a lunar impact crater that is located along the eastern edge of the Sinus Amoris, in the northeastern quadrant of the Moon's near side. Its diameter is 20 km. It was named after American psychologist Leonard Carmichael. It lies within a couple of crater diameters south-southwest of the smaller crater Hill. Further to the east-northeast is the prominent crater Macrobius. Carmichael was designated Macrobius A before being given its current name by the IAU.

Carmichael is generally circular, with a small floor at the middle of the sloping interior walls. There is a low rise of scree along the southeast inner wall. The crater is free of notable impacts along the rim or the interior, although a tiny craterlet is situated in the lunar mare just outside the rim to the south-southwest.

References

External links

 LTO-43C4 Carmichael — L&PI topographic map

Impact craters on the Moon